Justo Arroyo (born Colón, Republic of Panama, 5 January 1936) is a Panamanian writer and scholar, author of several award-winning stories and novels in his country and abroad.

Trajectory
Bachelors and professorate degree from the University of Panama and a Master and PhD in Letters at the National Autonomous University of Mexico.  Scholar in several universities and English and French translator.

He was the Panamanian Ambassador for Colombia and has been in several congresses and seminars all around America, Europe, Asia and Africa.
His work has been translated to English, German and Hungarian and has been published in several Anthology; among them, Seymour Menton's The Spanish-American Tale.

He's been jury of the "Casa de las Américas" award at La Habana, Cuba, 1982.

In 1997, the Simón Bolívar University of Barranquilla, Colombia, gave him the Honoris Causa honorary degree.

He was editor of the Revista Cultural Loteria from 1996 to 1999.  In 2000, the Panamanian Chamber of Books declared him "Writer of the Year".

Publications
La gayola, awarded in Guatemala, 1966. Prologue by José de Jesús Martínez.
Dedos, novel, Editorial Novaro, México, 1970.
Dejando atrás al hombre de celofán, novel, Ricardo Miró National Literature Award, Panama, 1971.
Capricornio en gris, tales, Ricardo Miró National Literature Award, Panama, 1972.
El pez y el segundo, novel, Educa Editorial, Costa Rica, 1978.
Geografía de mujer, Encuentro Editorial Group, Panama, 1982.
Rostros como manchas, tales, Ricardo Miró National Literature Award, Panama, 1991.
Semana sin viernes''', novel, Ricardo Miró National Literature Award, Panama, 1995.Para terminar diciembre, cuentos, Ricardo Miró National Literature Award, 1995.Corazón de águila, novel and biography of Marcos A. Gelabert, Panamanian aviation pioneer, Panama, 1996.Héroes a medio tiempo, tales, Rogelio Sinán Centralamerican award, Panama, 1997, prologue by Mempo Giardinelli.Lucio Dante resucita, novel, Ricardo Miró National Literature Award, Panamá, 1998. It was selected to become part of the Biblioteca de la Nacionalidad (Nationality Library), Panamá, 1999. Norma Editorial, Second Edition, 2007.Sin principio ni fin, novel, Panama, 1999.Cuentos de Eduardo, tales, César Candanedo Award, Panama, 2000.Réquiem por un duende, tales, Ricardo Miró National Literature Award, Panama, 2002.Vida que olvida, novel, Alfaguara, Santillana Group, Madrid, Spain, 2002.Otra luz'', novel, Ricardo Miró National Literature Award, 2008

External links
Justo Arroyo's official website
The Question published in Guernica Magazine

National Autonomous University of Mexico alumni
Panamanian male writers
Panamanian short story writers
Male short story writers
Panamanian novelists
Male novelists
People from Colón, Panama
Ambassadors of Panama to Colombia
Living people
1936 births
Panamanian expatriates in Mexico